Piura may refer to:
 Piura, a major city in Peru.
 Piura District, a district in the Piura province.
 Piura Province, a province in the Piura region.
 Piura Region, a region in Peru.
 Piura River, a river in Piura Region, see Geography of Peru#Northern Coast